The men's skeleton event at the 2018 Winter Olympics took place on 15 and 16 February at the Alpensia Sliding Centre near Pyeongchang, South Korea.

In the victory ceremony, the medals were presented by Ryu Seung-min, member of the International Olympic Committee, accompanied by Ivo Ferriani, International Bobsleigh and Skeleton Federation president and member of the International Olympic Committee.

Qualification

30 athletes qualified. Qualification is based on the combined rankings (across all four tours) as of 14 January 2018. The top three countries received three quotas each, the next six received two each and the last nine one each. Men had to be ranked in the top 60, after eliminating non-quota-earning competitors from countries that have earned their maximum quota. Ghana was awarded the continental quota for Africa. Competitors must compete in five races on three tracks during the 2016/17 season or 2017/18 season.

Results
The first two runs were held on 15 February and the last two on 16 February 2018.

TR – Track Record (in italics for previous marks). Top finish in each run is in boldface.

TR – Track Record

References

Skeleton at the 2018 Winter Olympics
Men's events at the 2018 Winter Olympics